Fatih Yılmaz (born 5 March 1989) is a Turkish former professional footballer who played as a midfielder.

Career
Born in Hannover, Yılmaz began his career in his hometown for VfB Hannover-Wülfel and in 2005 joined the youth team of Hannover 96. He played for Hannover 96 between 2005 and 2007 and signed then in the summer of the latter year with Eintracht Braunschweig. In May 2010 it was confirmed that his contract would not be renewed and he left the club on 30 June 2010.

In January 2011 he signed a contract with Türkcell Süper Lig club Manisaspor. However, after only a few months he returned to Germany and joined Eintracht Nordhorn in the fifth tier Niedersachsenliga. He signed with Regionalliga Nord club SV Wilhelmshaven during the winter break of the 2011–12 season.

Personal life
Fatih is the older brother of Yusuf Yılmaz and both hold a German passport.

References

1989 births
Living people
German people of Turkish descent
Footballers from Hanover
Turkish footballers
German footballers
Association football midfielders
Turkey youth international footballers
3. Liga players
First Professional Football League (Bulgaria) players
Eintracht Braunschweig players
Eintracht Braunschweig II players
Manisaspor footballers
Eintracht Nordhorn players
SV Wilhelmshaven players
FC Etar 1924 Veliko Tarnovo players
Denizlispor footballers
FSV Optik Rathenow players
Turkish expatriate footballers
Expatriate footballers in Bulgaria